Toate pînzele sus is a TV series of the Romanian Television (TVR), a film adaptation of the novel of the same name,  ("All Sails Up!"), written by Radu Tudoran.

Plot summary
Produced between 1976 and 1978, the series is presents the adventures, which became legendary, of two friends, the Romanian Anton Lupan and the French Pierre Vaillant. Anton Lupan leaves in search of the schooner L'Esperance, his and his friends' ship, without knowing that it has been attacked by pirates. But, above all, he is searching for Pierre, so they can leave together for an unknown land; which those who have tried to penetrate this land have died or have returned, after terrible trials, without success in exploring it. He finds the ship, but no one knows anything about his friend. Anton Lupan is forced to leave alone to journey over the Atlantic, with Tierra del Fuego his destination. The crew has many adventures, facing Moorish pirates and trying to save the cook when he gets in trouble by making reckless bets in Latin American ports. The men are courageous and upright, and so they manage to overcome all their trials and follow their captain with confidence in searching for his missing friend.

Cast

Main cast 
 Ion Besoiu – Anton Lupan
 Ilarion Ciobanu – Gherasim
 Sebastian Papaiani – Ieremia
 Jean Constantin – Ismail
  – Haralamb
  – Mihu
 Julieta Szönyi – Adnana (1, 4–6, 8–12)
 the puppy Lăbuș

Secondary roles 

 Ion Dichiseanu – Pierre Vaillant
  – Agop
  – Martin Strickland
 Colea Răutu – Spânu
 Ernest Maftei – old Alakaluf
 Tamara Buciuceanu – captain's wife (of the port of Sulina)
 Gheorghe Visu – Black Pedro
  – watchman of the Sulina lighthouse
 Alexandru Virgil Platon – pirate
  – captain of the port of Sulina
 
 
 
 
  – the robber sailor
 Nicolae Enache Praida 
  – captain Iani
  – the merchant from Marseille
  – Adnana's father
 Arcadie Donos
 Aristide Teică
 Petre Gheorghiu-Goe
 Gheorghe Șimonca
  – Slimbach
 
 Ștefan Moisescu
 N.N. Matei
 Marcel Gingulescu
 Ion Manolescu (II)

Episodes 
 Speranța
 Secretul epavei ("The Secret of the Shipwreck")
 Bazarul deșertăciunilor și Omul negru ("The Vanity Bazaar and the Boogeyman")
 Cine ești dumneata, domnule Vaillant? ("Who Are You, Mr. Vaillant?")
 Cântecul sirenei ("The Siren Song")
 Ancora împotmolită ("The Stranded Anchor")
 Uraganul și paharul de apă ("The Hurricane and the Glass of Water")
 O întâlnire ... sau chiar două ("A Meeting... or Even Two")
 Martin Strickland intră in scenă ("Martin Strickland Enters the Stage")
 Praf de aur ("Gold Dust")
 La capătul lumii ("At the End of the World")
 Aventura nu s-a sfârșit ("The Adventure Is Not Over")

Production 
The scenario for the series, based on Radu Tudoran's novel Toate pînzele sus! (1954), was written by Alexandru Struțeanu and Mircea Mureșan. The series was filmed in the Film Production Center studios in Bucharest; the producers benefited the support of the party and state organs from Constanța and Tulcea counties, and of the Ministries of Transport and Tourism. Shooting took place in the years 1975–1976.

The series was directed by Mircea Mureșan, helped by assistants directors Mariana Petculescu and Nicolae Corjos.

Production crew
 Nicu Stan – cinematography
 Nelly Merola – costumes
 Maria Neagu – film editing
 Radu Șerban – film score
 Marcel Bogos – set dresser
 Nicolae Ciolca – sound editing

Notes 

1977 television series debuts
Adventure television series
Romanian drama television series
1978 television series endings